Brain's Green is a hamlet in Gloucestershire, England.

References

Villages in Gloucestershire
Awre